Agnese Schebest, née Agnese Šebesta, also Agnese Schebesta (10 February 1813 – 22 December 1869) was an Austrian operatic mezzo-soprano. She lived as a singing teacher in Munich and Stuttgart.

Life and career 
Schebest was born in Vienna, the daughter of a Czech-born chief of the Austrian army. She moved to Prague as a child with her parents due to a professional change in her father's assignment. The latter died as a result of an injury while blasting the fortifications of Alessandria as early as 1816.

She lived with her mother in Terezin, where she attracted attention as a child at church concerts. At the age of eleven she got singing lessons free of charge with Kammersänger Johann Aloys Miksch and acting lessons with the actress Friederike Vohs in Dresden. At the Dresden court opera she sang early as choirist and comprimaria.

Schebest made her opera debut in 1830 as Benjamin in Méhul's Joseph at the Dresden court stage. As a result, she got a job there, which enabled her to take care financially of her family. Other roles included Leonore in Beethoven's Fidelio, Rebecca in Marschner's Der Templer und die Jüdin, Sesto in Mozart's La clemenza di Tito and Alice in Meyerbeer's Robert le diable. At that time Wilhelmine Schröder-Devrient also worked in Dresden and she was deeply impressed by her work.

After two years she terminated the Dresden contract, which also obliged her to act, because she feared that voice training could suffer under the speaking roles. After successful guest appearances in Berlin and Leipzig, she accepted an invitation to the stage in Budapest in spring 1832 where she was under contract until 1836. There she had successes as Agathe in Weber's Der Freischütz, Emmeline in Joseph Weigl's Die Schweizer Familie, Zerline in Mozart's Don Giovanni, Desdemona in Rossini's Otello, in the title role of Cherubini's Médée and especially as Romeo in Bellini's I Capuleti ed i Montecchi.

In 1834 and 1835 she made guest tours to Vienna, Dresden and Graz. After the end of her engagement in Budapest, she gave guest performances at the leading German opera houses from 1836 to 1841. At this time she had her residence in Nuremberg. After a stay in Paris she travelled Italy in 1841 with performances in Trieste and Venice. Afterwards she came to Weimar, Schwerin, Warsaw, Lemberg, Munich and finally to Karlsruhe in June 1842. She ended her career because she had married the theologian and biographer David Friedrich Strauß. The marriage, which produced two children, was unhappy and ended in divorce after a few years.

Schebest died in Stuttgart at age 56.

Publications 
 Aus dem Leben einer Künstlerin Stuttgart: Ebner & Seubert, 1857 (Google-Digitalisat)
 Rede und Geberde. Studien über mündlichen Vortrag und plastischen Ausdruck Leipzig: Abel, 1861

Further reading 
 Heinrich Ferdinand Mannstein: Denkwürdigkeiten der churfürstlichen und königlichen Hofmusik zu Dresden im 18. und 19. Jahrhundert : Nach geheimen Papieren und Mittheilungen. Containing: Life pictures of Johann Aloys Miksch and his pupils: Alphonso Zesi, Bergmann, Schröder-Devrient, Agnes Schebest, Naumann, Carl Maria v. Weber, Morlacchi, Benelli etc. Heinrich Mattes, Leipzig 1863 MDZ Reader.
 
 
 Anton Schott and Maximilian Hörberg (ed.): Hie Welf! Hie Waibling! - Streitfragen auf dem Gebiete des Gesanges (revised new edition of the 1st edition: Berlin 1904), Verlag Maximilian Hörberg, Munich 2008. .

Footnotes

External links 
 

Austrian operatic mezzo-sopranos
Voice teachers
1813 births
1869 deaths
Musicians from Vienna
19th-century Austrian women opera singers